Stamen Gigov Grigorov (27 October 1878 – 27 October 1945) was a prominent Bulgarian physician and microbiologist. He discovered the Lactobacillus bulgaricus bacillus, used in the making of yogurt.

Life
"Cold Spring"), Pernik Province, Bulgaria. He completed his secondary education in natural sciences in Montpellier, France and medical science in Geneva, Switzerland. In 1905, at the age of 27, Grigorov made the discovery for which he is best known. In the microbiological laboratory of Professor Léon Massol in Geneva, he discovered that a certain strain of bacillus is the basis of yogurt. In recognition the strain was called by the scientific community Lactobacillus bulgaricus.

In the 1950s, the state-owned yogurt company patented and promoted a specific blend of bacterial strains to create an "official Bulgarian yoghurt". This blend continues to be exported to yogurt producers in many countries.

Apart from the discovery of Lactobacillus bulgaricus, Grigorov contributed to the creation of a tuberculosis treatment in 1906, along with Albert Calmette. This used penicillin fungi for the treatment of tuberculosis. Through his scientific experiments in-vitro and in-vivo on lab animals and later on human patients, Grigorov demonstrated the healing effect of penicillin fungi in the treatment of tuberculosis.

Grigorov died on 27 October 1945, his 67th birthday.

Legacy

Grigorov Glacier on Brabant Island in Palmer Archipelago, Antarctica is named after Stamen Grigorov.

On 27 October 2020, Stamen was honoured by Google as the Google Doodle of the day.

References

Further reading

1878 births
1945 deaths
20th-century Bulgarian physicians
Bulgarian expatriates in Switzerland
Bulgarian microbiologists
Bulgarian military personnel of World War I
Bulgarian military personnel of the Balkan Wars
People from Pernik Province
Recipients of the Order of Bravery
University of Geneva alumni